Miss Philippines Earth 2021 was the 21st edition of the Miss Philippines Earth pageant. Due to the COVID-19 pandemic in the Philippines, it was held virtually for the second year in a row on August 8, 2021.

At the end of the event, Roxanne Baeyens crowned Naelah Alshorbaji of Parañaque City as Miss Philippines Earth 2021. With her crowned are the court of elemental queens: Ameera Almamari was named Miss Philippines Air, Rocel Songano was named Miss Philippines Water, Roni Meneses was named Miss Philippines Fire, and Sofia Lopez Galve was named Miss Philippines Eco Tourism 2021.

The coronation was broadcast by ABS-CBN at Kapamilya Channel after being absent from the previous year's competition.

Results 
 Color keys
  The contestant was a Semi-Finalist in an International pageant.

§ – Voted into Top 20 by viewers

Special awards

Contestants 
66 contestants representing various cities, municipalities, provinces, and communities abroad competed for the title.

Judges 
 Marc Nelson – TV Host, Environmentalist and WWF and World Vision Ambassador
 Nguyễn Phương Khánh – Miss Earth 2018 and Top Influencer & Celebrity in Vietnam
 Kim Atienza – TV Host, Actor, and Weather Anchor in ABS-CBN
 Lindsey Coffey – Miss Earth 2020, WWF Ambassador Climate Reality Leader and Professional Model
 Michael Seifert – International Model and Founder of TalentMan Models in Germany

Notes

References 

Beauty pageants in the Philippines
2021
2021 beauty pageants